The Fayetteville Public Schools (Fayetteville School District, or FPS) is the first public school district chartered in Arkansas. The system was established with the creation of public schools in Arkansas in 1871, the same year as the University of Arkansas, also located in Fayetteville, Arkansas. It is accredited by the Arkansas Department of Education. The Fayetteville school district's public schools would successfully integrate in 1954, three years before the Little Rock Nine.

In addition to the majority of Fayetteville, the district also serves most of Goshen and Johnson and portions of Elkins and Farmington.

In 2013, the district was awarded as a U.S. Department of Education Green Ribbon School.

List of schools

High/Secondary Schools
 Fayetteville High School

Middle/intermediate schools
 Holt Middle School
 McNair Middle School
 Ramay Junior High School
 Woodland Junior High School

Elementary/PrimarySchools
 Asbell Elementary School
 Butterfield Trail Elementary School
 Happy Hollow Elementary School
 Holcomb Elementary School
 Leverett Elementary School
 Root Elementary School
 Vandergriff Elementary School
 Washington Elementary School

In 2009, Vandergriff Elementary School received top honors from the U.S. Department of Education (ED) in being named a National Blue Ribbon School.

Special Schools & Programs
 Owl Creek School (Pre K-7)
 Lake Fayetteville Environmental Study Center

Administration
The Fayetteville School Board consists of seven members who are elected to five year terms. The members of the board meet regularly on the fourth Thursday of each month at 5 pm Central Time in the Adams Leadership Center.

See also
 List of school districts in Arkansas

References

External links
FayAR.net - Official Website

School districts in Arkansas
Education in Fayetteville, Arkansas
Education in Washington County, Arkansas
1871 establishments in Arkansas
School districts established in 1871